Pseudocrioceras is an extinct genus of ammonites. The species Pseudocrioceras anthulai has been found in strata from the Barremian - Aptian age of Chipatá, Santander, Colombia and is known from Georgia and Dagestan. The species Pseudocrioceras duvalianum and Pseudocrioceras fasciculare are found in the Barremian of France.

This genus was an actively mobile carnivore with a nektonic lifestyle.

Species
 Pseudocrioceras anthulai Eristavi 1955
 Pseudocrioceras duvalianum (d’Orbigny, 1842)
 Pseudocrioceras'fasciculare (d’Orbigny, 1840)

References

Ancyloceratoidea
Ammonitida genera
Cretaceous ammonites
Ammonites of South America
Cretaceous Colombia
Altiplano Cundiboyacense
Ammonites of Europe
Cretaceous Europe
Cretaceous France
Barremian life
Aptian life
Fossil taxa described in 1924
Paja Formation